The 2022–23 season is the 90th season in the existence of FC Red Bull Salzburg and the club's 34th consecutive season in the top flight of Austrian football. In addition to the domestic league, Salzburg are participating in this season's editions of the Austrian Cup, the UEFA Champions League and the UEFA Europa League.

Players

First-team squad

Out on loan

Transfers

In:

Out:

Competitions

Overall record

Bundesliga

Regular stage

League table

Results summary

Results by round

Matches

Austrian Cup

UEFA Champions League

Group stage

The draw for the group stage was held on 25 August 2022 in Istanbul, Turkey. Die Roten Bullen were drawn against Milan, Chelsea and Dinamo Zagreb.

UEFA Europa League

Knockout phase

Knockout round play-offs
The draw for the knockout round play-offs was held on 7 November 2022 in Nyon, Switzerland. Die Roten Bullen were drawn against Roma.

References

FC Red Bull Salzburg seasons
Red Bull Salzburg
Red Bull Salzburg